St. John's Cathedral is a cathedral of the Episcopal Church in Jacksonville, Florida, U.S. One of the oldest congregations in Jacksonville, it became the seat of the Bishop of the Episcopal Diocese of Florida in 1951. The current building dates to 1906.

History

The congregation was founded in 1834 as St. John's Parish. It is one of the seven original parishes dating to the reception of the Diocese of Florida into the Episcopal General Convention in 1838. According to the cornerstone for the present Cathedral, the first St. Johns Church was built in 1842 and burned in 1862 during the American Civil War. In the early 1870s, Edward Tuckerman Potter designed a new St. Johns and initial construction began in 1873. The church was completed and dedicated in 1877. This building burned in the Great Fire of 1901, which destroyed most of Downtown Jacksonville, and the next year a new church was designed by Howard Nott Potter of the firm Snelling and Potter. St. John's Cathedral was completed and consecrated in 1906.

St. John's is the only cathedral in Jacksonville. Inside the building is cavernous; built in the Gothic Revival architectural style, stained-glass windows line the walls. In 1983, Advent Glass Works restored or repaired all stained glass in the cathedral, the cloister and the Cummings Chapel.

School
The St. John's Cathedral School is sponsored by the cathedral and diocese and includes infants to Pre-K 4. It also receives funding from the Jessie Ball duPont Fund.

Café
Clara's at the Cathedral Café is a cooperative project between the cathedral and the School of Culinary Arts at the Clara White Mission. Every Friday since April 13, 2007, the students and staff from the mission's culinary school prepare a lunch that is sold to the community. The meal is reasonably priced and attracts workers from downtown businesses and retirees.

See also
List of the Episcopal cathedrals of the United States
List of cathedrals in Florida
Episcopal High School of Jacksonville

References

External links

St. John’s Cathedral, Jacksonville website
St. John's Cathedral School website
The Diocese of Florida website
The Episcopal Diocese of Florida
St. John's Music information
Cathedral Organ Layout
Episcopal High School

Episcopal churches in Jacksonville, Florida
John Jacksonville
Episcopal church buildings in Florida
Religious organizations established in 1834
1834 establishments in Florida Territory
Churches completed in 1906
Downtown Jacksonville